Viktor Jalmar "Jalmari" Kivenheimo (25 September 1889 – 29 October 1994) was a Finnish gymnast who competed in the 1912 Summer Olympics.

He was part of the Finnish team, which won the silver medal in the gymnastics men's team, free system event. He is the longest lived Olympic medalist, as he died in 1994 at the age of 105 years. He was the last surviving Olympic medalist born before the 1896 Games began on 6 April.

References

1889 births
1994 deaths
Finnish centenarians
Finnish male artistic gymnasts
Gymnasts at the 1912 Summer Olympics
Olympic gymnasts of Finland
Olympic silver medalists for Finland
Olympic medalists in gymnastics
Medalists at the 1912 Summer Olympics
Men centenarians
20th-century Finnish people